Albania participated in the 2019 European Games held in Minsk from 21 to 30 June 2019. Albania was represented by 13 athletes in 6 sports in these competitions.

Archery

Recurve

Boxing

Men

Cycling

Road
Men

Judo

Men

Shooting

Men

Women

Mixed

Wrestling

Key:
 VPO1 – Victory by points – the loser with technical points

Men's freestyle

References

Nations at the 2019 European Games
European Games
2019